Reginaldo Rivera de la Torre (born 10 April 1960) is a Mexican politician from the Institutional Revolutionary Party. From 2009 to 2012 he served as Deputy of the LXI Legislature of the Mexican Congress representing Querétaro.

References

1960 births
Living people
Politicians from Querétaro
Institutional Revolutionary Party politicians
21st-century Mexican politicians
Autonomous University of Queretaro alumni
Deputies of the LXI Legislature of Mexico
Members of the Chamber of Deputies (Mexico) for Querétaro